Dezső Ákos Hamza (1 September 1903 - 16 May 1993) was a Hungarian film director. He directed more than ten films from 1941 to 1956.

Selected filmography

References

External links 

1903 births
1993 deaths
Hungarian film directors